Wilhelm Meyer may refer to:

 Wilhelm Franz Meyer (1856–1934), German mathematician
 Wilhelm Meyer (philologist) (1845–1917), who identified the poems of Hugh Prima
 Wilhelm Meyer, inculpated in the Adolph Beck case
 Wilhelm Meyer (physician), Danish physician who invented adenoidectomy in 1868
 Wilhelm Meyer (rosarian) (1870–1954), German priest and rosarian in Altnau